The Downfall of Capitalism and Communism is a book by Ravi Batra in the field of historical evolution, first published in 1978. The book's full title is The Downfall of Capitalism and Communism: A New Study of History. Following the collapse of Soviet Communism, a second edition was published in 1990 with the title The Downfall of Capitalism and Communism: Can Capitalism Be Saved?

The book introduced an application of P.R. Sarkar's idea that different socio-political groups, based on "inherent differences in human nature", that in turn are rooted in "characteristics of the mind," rotate in controlling the social motivity, determine the historical evolution over time. Batra argues that groups of warriors, intellectuals or acquisitors take turns at leading society in their respective ages marked by ascension, supremacy and decline; citing historical examples.

The end of the Soviet Union and the Iron curtain occurred just over one decade after the book was published; but the regime was not replaced in the way Batra predicted.

Predictions
Batra predicted that both capitalism and communism would collapse around the year 2000. The Italian Prime Minister awarded Batra the Medal of the Italian Senate for this prediction in 1990.

Downfall of capitalism
Batra suggested capitalism would collapse before communism.

In 1985, in The Great Depression of 1990, Batra predicted the collapse of capitalism would begin in 1990. In 2007, Batra made new predictions in his book The New Golden Age: The Coming Revolution against Political Corruption and Economic Chaos which he subsequently felt were being realised with the Occupy Wall Street movement.

See also
 Predictions of the dissolution of the Soviet Union
 Progressive Utilization Theory

References

1978 non-fiction books
American political books
Books about capitalism
Books about communism